Marx and Modern Economics is a 1968 book about the philosopher Karl Marx edited by David Horowitz.

Reception
Marx and Modern Economics received a positive review from the economist Shigeto Tsuru in the Journal of Economic Literature. He found Horowitz's introduction too brief, but considered him correct to emphasize that the subject matter of Marx's political economy was "the social determination of economic categories and relationships and their development" and to include Marx's introduction to the A Contribution to the Critique of Political Economy (1859). Though believing that some important articles that should have been represented were excluded, he welcomed the book as a "convenient anthology for classroom reference."

References

Bibliography
Journals

  

1968 non-fiction books
American non-fiction books
Books about Karl Marx
Books about Marxism
Books by David Horowitz
English-language books